Gastón Gaudio and Max Mirnyi were the defending champions, but Gaudio did not compete this year to focus on the singles tournament. Mirnyi teamed up with Mischa Zverev and lost in first round to tournament runners-up Guillermo García-López and Fernando Verdasco.

František Čermák and Leoš Friedl won the tournament by defeating García-López and Verdasco 6–4, 6–4 in the final.

Seeds

Draw

Draw

References
 Main Draw (ATP)

Stuttgart Open Doubles
Doubles 2007